Tangi Miller (born February 28, 1970) is an American actress, model, director and dancer. As an actress she is known for the role of Elena Tyler on the popular television drama Felicity. Miller has received two NAACP Image Award nominations throughout her career. Starting in the mid 2000s, Miller focused on indie films and has worked as a producer and director.

Early life
Miller was born and raised in Miami, Florida, the eldest of six children. She and her siblings were not permitted to watch television as they grew up due to their parents' religious beliefs. At high school, Miller began acting in stage productions. She did not plan to become an actress and chose to major in marketing while attending Alabama State University.

Miller realized she spent all of her free time acting, so after graduation she pursued that at Alabama State. She earned a Master of Fine Arts degree at the University of California, Irvine. She studied at the Royal National Theatre in London, as well as at the Alabama Shakespeare Festival.

Acting
After appearing on the HBO comedy Arli$$ (1996), and on the CBS drama Michael Hayes (1997), Miller went on to stardom as a cast member of The WB hit show Felicity (1998−2002), playing smart and stylish Elena Tyler, a premedical student. For her work on the series, Miller was nominated in 2002 for an NAACP Image Award in the category of Outstanding Actress in a Drama Series. She was named as one of TV Guide's Sexiest Faces. Miller was also featured in Ol' Dirty Bastard's music video of "Got Your Money" in 1999 as a dancer.

Miller played the lead role in BET movie Playing with Fire, starring opposite Vanessa Estelle Williams. She appeared alongside Mekhi Phifer in the independent film The Other Brother (2002). She was the wife of MC Hammer, Stephanie, in the 2001 VH1 film Too Legit: The MC Hammer Story. Miller was the lead in Leprechaun: Back 2 tha Hood and played Donna in Tyler Perry's Madea's Family Reunion (2006). 

She portrayed the daughter of Claudette Wyms (CCH Pounder) on The Shield in 2002. In 2005, she earned her second NAACP Image Award nomination for Outstanding Actress in a Television Movie, Mini-Series or Dramatic Special for acting in sci-fi film Phantom Force. Miller appeared in guest roles on crime dramas The District (2003) and The Division (2004), as well as an appearance on sitcom Half & Half (2005), her latest acting role on television to date.

Following her role in Madea's Family Reunion, Miller has chiefly acted in independent films, including Hurricane in the Rose Garden, Guardian of Eden, Hollywood Chaos and Diva Diaries.

Producing & directing 
Miller produced the Ghanaian film Police Officer 3 and the 2008 film After School. She produced her third film Love & Other 4 Letter Words in April 2006.

Miller's directorial debut was in 2017, for the film Diva Diaries — in which she also was producer and co-star. The film was first shown at the Pan African Film Festival in 2017.

Filmography

Film

Television

References

External links
 
 

1970 births
African-American actresses
American film actresses
American television actresses
Living people
Actresses from Miami
American female dancers
African-American female dancers
Alabama State University alumni
University of California, Irvine alumni
Female models from Florida
21st-century African-American people
21st-century African-American women
20th-century African-American people
20th-century African-American women